Juba Kalamka  (born July 12, 1970) is an African American bisexual artist and activist recognized for his work and founding member of homohop group Deep Dickollective (D/DC) and his development of the micro-label sugartruck recordings.

Kalamka has coordinated the release and promotion of five critically successful D/DC albums, the Outmusic Award winning solo debut of former Sister Spit member Rocco "Katastrophe" Kayiatos, and the distribution of the work of numerous other artists in the homohop community.

Kalamka's personal work centers on dialogues on the convergences and conflicts of race, identity, gender, sexuality and class in pop culture. He has written and illustrated several articles for pop culture magazines and journals, Kitchen Sink, ColorLines, and the now-defunct bisexual issues magazine Anything That Moves.

He has been a speaker, panelist, and curator for numerous organizations and conferences, among them the San Francisco Black Gay/Lesbian Film Festival, GLAAD, Hip Hop as a Movement at the University of Wisconsin–Madison, and Burning Closets/Working Our Way Home at Oberlin College. In November 2005, Kalamka was chosen to be one of six plenary speakers at the National Gay and Lesbian Task Force's 2005 Creating Change Conference and received a Creating Change Award for his activist work in queer music community.

Kalamka served as Festival Director for the now defunct East Bay (Oakland, California) Pride  in 2003 and the curator/director of PeaceOUT World Homo Hop Festival which ran annually from 2001 through 2007. The success of PeaceOUT inspired the creation of three now-defunct sister festivals; Peace Out East in New York City, Peace Out South in Atlanta, Georgia, and Peace Out UK in  London, England.

Kalamka appears extensively in Alex Hinton's 2005 documentary Pick Up the Mic, an active survey of the scene through documentation of homohop artists on tour and in performance at the various PeaceOUT festivals.

In 2003, Kalamka continued his personal and artistic dialogues on sexuality and race with appearances in three sex films; Good Vibrations/Sexpositive Productions G Marks the Spot, Joani Blank's Orgasm: Faces of Ecstasy, and the unreleased Radio Dildo Libre (David Findlay/Blissful Itch Productions). In 2005, Kalamka was contacted by artist and sex worker advocate Annie Oakley (whom he'd met at the Olympia, Washington queer arts fest HomoAGoGo) and accepted an invitation to tour with The Sex Workers'Art Show, a month-long cross-country cabaret-style theater event featuring current and former sex worker artist/activists. Deep Dickollective's fifth and final disc, On Some Other was released on Sugartruck in June 2007.

In December 2006, Kalamka completed the MFA program in Poetics (minoring in Queer and Activist Performance through the schools Experimental Performance Institute) at New College of California in San Francisco. An essay/interview with Kalamka and former bandmate Tim'm West appears in hip hop writer Jeff Chang's collection Total Chaos: the Art and Aesthetics of Hip Hop (Basic Civitas Books). He was elected to the Board of Directors of the Queer Cultural Center (producers of the National Queer Arts Festival) and the Strategic Committee of sex worker advocacy organization Desiree Alliance in 2011. He joined the board of national bisexual advocacy organization BiNet USA in 2018 and was elected Vice President in 2019.
Kalamka resigned as Vice President in August 2020 and left the organization in October 2020.

On January 18, 2022 Kill Rock Stars announced the release of the first single and accompanying music video(directed by media artist John Sanborn) by queer rap rock/nü metal collective COMMANDO, featuring performances by Kalamka, The Living Earth Show, former Tribe 8 lead singer Lynnee Breedlove and RuPaul’s Drag Race performer Honey Mahogany, with a full-length album to be released on March 4, 2022. 

Kalamka's first poetry collection Son of Byford was released by Nomadic Press in July, 2022.

Discography

with Deep Dickollective

 2001 BourgieBohoPostPomoAfroHomo    sugartruck recordings
 2001 Independent Sounds:Amoeba Music Compilation Vol. III  Hip Hop Slam
 2002 Phat Family Compilation Volume One:Tha Dozens Phat Family Records
 2003 Them Niggas Done Went And Said...   sugartruck recordings
 2004 Azadi!: A Benefit CD For RAWA (compilation) Fire Museum/ElectroMotive Records
 2003 Movin' b/w Straightrippin'(C-Phlavormix) (7" single) Agitprop!/sugartruck
 2004 The Famous Outlaw League of Proto-Negroes  sugartruck recordings
 2004 Phat Family Compilation Volume Two:Down 4 Tha Swerve Phat Family Records
 2005 Live at Wildseed and Mo  sugartruck recordings
 2007 On Some Other   sugartruck recordings
 2012 With The Key(Sissies):The Very Best of Deep Dickollective sugartruck recordings

as Juba Kalamka

 2012 Ooogaboooga Under Fascism  sugartruck recordings
 2012 This and That (Instrumental/s)  sugartruck recordings
 2014 Codeswitchings (Black Things Tomorrow?) sugartruck recordings

as The Joe Louis Milk Company

 2020 You Don't Have To Be (instrumentals)  Motisa Methods/sugartruck recordings

with Rainbow Flava

 2001 Family Business  Phat Family Records

with Leroy F. Moore Jr. (as JKLM)

 2018 Invalidations, Volume Too  sugartruck recordings/KripHopNation

with Marvin K. White (as Black Ellipsis...)

 2020 Tth Spc Btwn...A Seminary Avenue Motisa Methods/sugartruck recordings

with He Who Walks Three Ways

 1994 Me, IBM and The Baby Jesus (self-released demo) Biglip/WGBL? 
 2020 Technology Delivered 91/94 Motisa Methods

with COMMANDO

 2022 Hotel Essex (single) Kill Rock Stars

 2022 COMMANDO (album) Kill Rock Stars
 2023 EMET(Izdis Hymn?) (single) Kill Rock Stars
 2023 Diet Soda (single) Kill Rock Stars

Filmography

 2003 G Marks The Spot:The Good Vibrations Guide to the G-Spot  Sexpositive Productions
 2004 Orgasm!The Faces of Ecstasy  Joani Blank, dir. Blank Tapes
 2005 Pick Up The Mic  (as himself) Alex Hinton, dir. Planet Janice Films
 2006 Making It (background music) Sobaz Benjamin, dir. National Film Board of Canada 
 2007 Godspeed  (Weed Man/Dime Bag Dealer) AltCinema Productions
 2008 La bisexualité: tout un art?  (as himself) Laure Michel and Eric Wastiaux. dir.
 2010 That's So GAY! (as himself) KB Boyce, dir. QPOC Artists and Mass Media 
 2011 The Craving  (prod., additional music) Val Killmore Castro, dir. Hellfire Cinema
 2012 Heavenly Spire: Juba (as himself) Shine Louise Houston, dir. Pink Label
 2013 Sins Invalid   (producer, additional music)  Patty Berne, dir.
 2014 Fuckstyles 2   (as himself)  Trouble Films Courtney Trouble,dir.
 2014 Fucking Mystic (as himself) Trouble Films Courtney Trouble, dir.
 2019 Is Friendship Legal Ms. Zoe Kat and Salty Brine, dir.
 2019 Whores On Film (aka The Celluloid Bordello) (as himself) Juliana Piccilo, dir.
 2020 The Shock of Gary Fisher(w/COMMANDO) music video John Sanborn, dir.
 2021 The Friend (as St. Fractious) John Sanborn, dir.
 2022 Hotel Essex(w/COMMANDO) music video John Sanborn, dir.
 2022 Prince(w/COMMANDO)   music video Daniel Foerste, dir.

References

External links
  Juba Kalamka official website
  Deep Dickollective official website
 Son of Byford at Nomadic Press
 COMMANDO official website

1970 births
Living people
LGBT rappers
Bisexual men
Bisexual musicians
African-American rappers
American LGBT musicians
Rappers from Chicago
LGBT African Americans
21st-century American rappers
LGBT people from Illinois
20th-century LGBT people
21st-century LGBT people
21st-century African-American musicians
20th-century African-American people
African-American poets
American LGBT poets